Stephen Jay Berg (born March 3, 1951) is an American prelate of the Roman Catholic Church who has been serving as bishop of the Diocese of Pueblo in Colorado since 2014.

Biography

Early life 
Stephen Berg was born on March 3, 1951, the eldest of ten children to Connie and Jeanne Berg in Miles City, Montana. He was educated in the local Catholic schools and in 1969 graduated from Sacred Heart High School in Miles City.  He earned a Bachelor of Music degree in piano performance from the University of Colorado Boulder in Boulder, Colorado, and a Master of Music degree from Eastern New Mexico University in Portales, New Mexico. After college, Berg taught music at Tarrant County College in Fort Worth, Texas.  He later worked in management for a nursery company in Georgia, California, and Texas for 14 years.

In 1993, Berg started studies for the priesthood at Assumption Seminary in San Antonio.  In 1999, he received a master of divinity degree at the Oblate School of Theology also in San Antonio.

Priesthood 
On May 15, 1999, Berg was ordained a priest for the Diocese of Fort Worth by his uncle, Bishop Joseph Charron. After his ordination, Berg began serving as the parochial vicar at St. Michael’s Parish in Bedford, Texas. In 2001 he became parochial vicar at St. John the Apostle Parish in North Richland Hills, Texas.

In 2002, Berg was appointed pastor for four parishes in rural Texas:

 St. Mary's in Henrietta
 St. Jerome in Bowie 
 St. William in Montague
 St. Joseph in Nocona

In 2008, Berg was appointed the vicar general of the diocese while also serving as the pastor of St. Peter the Apostle Parish in Fort Worth. In 2012, he was named moderator of the curia and parochial administrator of Holy Name of Jesus Parish in Fort Worth. In December 2012, Berg was elected diocesan administrator sede vacante by the diocesan board of consultors.

Bishop of Pueblo 
Pope Francis named Berg as the bishop of the Diocese of Pueblo on January 15, 2014. He was consecrated on February 27, 2014, by Archbishop Samuel Aquila.  Bishop Charron and Bishop Michael Sheridan were the principal co-consecrators.  The liturgy was held in Memorial Hall in Pueblo, Colorado.

On August 10, 2021, Berg and other Colorado bishops signed a letter opposing mandatory COVID-19 vaccinations for business and government employees.

See also

 Catholic Church hierarchy
 Catholic Church in the United States
 Historical list of the Catholic bishops of the United States
 List of Catholic bishops of the United States
 Lists of patriarchs, archbishops, and bishops

References

External links

Roman Catholic Diocese of Pueblo Official Site

Episcopal succession

1951 births
Living people
People from Miles City, Montana
People from Fort Worth, Texas
University of Colorado alumni
Eastern New Mexico University alumni
Roman Catholic bishops of Pueblo
21st-century Roman Catholic bishops in the United States
Catholics from Texas
Catholics from Montana
Bishops appointed by Pope Francis